Ido and Interlingua are two constructed languages created in the 20th century, Ido circa 1910 and Interlingua circa 1940. Both have had some measure of success, but Interlingua has enjoyed greater diffusion and acceptance by public and private institutions—it is taught in many high schools and universities, for example. Ido was developed by a small committee from Reformed Esperanto, whereas Interlingua was developed from scratch by an American organization, the IALA.

Ido is what is called schematic (easier to learn for speakers of very different languages), whereas Interlingua is what is called naturalistic (easier to understand for speakers of related languages).

Neutrality of vocabulary 
While both languages have majority Latin and Romance words in their lexicons, Ido has a somewhat larger number of Germanic and Slavic words, so it could be suggested that Ido is more internationally neutral.  Germanic and Slavic words in Interlingua are often Romanized. When Interlingua adopts foreign words, however, they frequently retain their original form.  By comparison, almost all words in Ido take on characteristic Ido finals and orthographies, except that Ido proper names have a greater degree of flexibility than other Ido words.

Both languages make use of an objective procedure to identify international words for their lexicons. Interlingua's procedure identifies a prototype that is common to the various forms of a word in its source languages, and its control languages are selected to increase the internationality of its vocabulary. Since their vocabularies are very similar, it is likely that both languages possess an internationality that extends beyond the Western language families.

Wordforms can enter the vocabulary of Interlingua by derivation from a small number of roots and affixes. Speakers who are familiar with these roots and affixes can understand words developed from them, a feature that facilitates learning for speakers of any language background.

Orthography 
Both languages use the Latin alphabet, but Ido orthography is such that based on the spelling of a word, you can pronounce it unambiguously. This is largely true of Interlingua as well.

Sample text

See also
Comparison between Esperanto and Interlingua
Comparison between Esperanto and Ido
Comparison between Ido and Novial

External links
Comparison between Ido and Interlingua at the Conlang Atlas of Language Structure

Interlingua
Comparison of constructed languages
Ido language